Archibald Needham (2 August 1881 – 1950) was an English footballer, who played for Crystal Palace in a variety of positions.

Career
Born in Sheffield, Needham played professionally for Sheffield United but unlike his namesake (relative?) Ernest Needham he was not a regular first team player. In 1905 he joined new club Crystal Palace, and was the club's top scorer in their first season, playing in the Southern League Division Two. Needham was a versatile player, and played in almost every position save for goalkeeper whilst at Palace. On 21 January 1909, he scored a memorable goal against Football League side Wolves in an FA Cup first round replay. In the dying minutes of extra time, Fred Fountain wrote of the goal in the Croydon Advertiser in 1946: "...he simply weaved his way through all the players and dribbled it right up to the Wolves' goal, putting in an unstoppable shot." Writing in The Penny Illustrated Paper, John Cameron called Needham "The brilliant Crystal Palace 'utility man'."

References

1881 births
1950 deaths
English footballers
Sheffield United F.C. players
Crystal Palace F.C. players
English Football League players
Southern Football League players
Glossop North End A.F.C. players
Association football utility players
Association football defenders
Association football midfielders
Association football forwards